Estadio El Molinón, officially Estadio Municipal El Molinón-Enrique Castro "Quini", is an association football stadium in Gijón, Asturias, Spain. The stadium is the home ground of Real Sporting de Gijón. With a capacity of 29,029 seats, El Molinón is the 20th largest stadium in Spain and the second largest in Asturias.

History

El Molinón is the oldest professional football field in Spain. It has been in use since at least 1908, and is located on the site of an old watermill, hence the stadium's name, the Spanish word for "big mill".

Real Sporting started to use El Molinón as official ground in 1917. The first official match was held on April 22, 1917 between Real Sporting and Arenas Club de Getxo as part of the 1917 Copa del Rey. Arenas won 0–1. On August 5 of that same year, the first great renovation of the stadium was finished.

On 2 May 1920, El Molinón held the 1920 Copa del Rey Final, where Barcelona defeated Athletic Bilbao by 2–0.

In 1924 Real Sporting bought El Molinón and became the owner of the stadium. In 1931 the main stand was destroyed by fire, but it was later re-built. In 1944, Gijón City Hall re-bought El Molinón due to Real Sporting's bad financial situation.

In 1968 four floodlights were installed at El Molinón and the first night match was played against Mestalla. On 11 April 1969, due to the financial trouble of Real Sporting, the stadium was formally sold to the city Town Hall by 30 million pesetas. On 30 November 1969, El Molinón became the first all-covered stadium in Spain and on 28 January 1970, the first match to be televised in Spain was played at El Molinón. Real Sporting defeated Osasuna by 3–0. The club also played all of its UEFA Cup home-matches in this stadium, including the win against A.C. Milan by 1–0 on 30 September 1987.

On 28 June 1995, Real Sporting beat the record attendance for the club at El Molinón, with 42,000 people at the relegation playoffs against Lleida.

During 1997–98, El Molinón prepared to adapt to the new UEFA and FIFA security legislation: all people must be seated and the fences must be removed. The stadium's capacity was reduced from 42,000 to 25,885. However, plans were put forward for the stadium to be renovated and expanded. After the expansion between 2009 and 2011, El Molinón's capacity again grew to 29,029 seats.

On 28 February 2018, just one day after the death of Real Sporting's all-time top scorer Quini, the City Council of Gijón agreed unanimously to rename the stadium as Estadio El Molinón-Enrique Castro "Quini" in his memory. Three months later, after a popular initiative, the gate 1 of the stadium was renamed as former goalkeeper Jesús Castro, brother of Quini.

On 8 January 2019, El Molinón used for the first time the video assistant referee at the Copa del Rey round of 16 match against Valencia. However, as in that season it was only used in La Liga, the stadium would not have again the VAR until the 2019–20 season.

The stadium hosted its first women's football match ever on 21 April 2019. 9,700 spectators attended the local derby between Real Sporting and Gijón FF.

League attendances

This is a list of league and playoffs games attendances of Sporting de Gijón at El Molinón.

Sporting played all the competitive games at this stadium except one in the 2002–03 season due to the closure of the stadium after the game against Numancia. This game, not included in the table, was played against Almería at the Estadio Antonio Amilivia in León.

Games played under closed doors are not included.

International matches

Spain national team matches
The first international match in El Molinón was held on 22 April 1928 between Spain and Italy. 49 years later, El Molinón held again another international match between Spain and Norway. On 22 March 2013, El Molinón held a World Cup Qualifying match between Spain and Finland. The match finished in a 1–1 draw.

1982 FIFA World Cup
The stadium played host to three matches in Group B. Two of them were famous in the 1982 World Cup, West Germany's shock 1–2 defeat to Algeria being the first. After the result of Algeria's final group game was known, a rather uncontested 1–0 victory of West Germany against Austria which sent both teams through at Algeria's expense. In German the match is known as Nichtangriffspakt von Gijón (lit. Non-aggression pact of Gijón) or Schande von Gijón (lit. Disgrace of Gijón). This shameful game at Gijon directly led to a change of the rules, requiring the last matches in the group phase to be played simultaneously.

Other
In 1981, some scenes of the film Volver a empezar, prized with the Academy Award for Best Foreign Language Film in 1983, were shot in El Molinón.

The stadium has hosted concerts by many famous artists, including:

 Bon Jovi (1996)
 Paul McCartney (2004)
 Dire Straits (1992)
 The Rolling Stones (1995)
 Bruce Springsteen (1993, 2003 and 2013)
 Sting (1991)
 Tina Turner (1991)
 Alejandro Sanz (2001)

References

External links

El Molinón at Sporting website
Estadios de España

Football venues in Asturias
Sporting de Gijón
1982 FIFA World Cup stadiums
Gijón
Sports venues completed in 1908